Gusta Fučíková, born Gusta (Augusta) Kodeřičová (28 August 1903 Ostředek – 25 March 1987), was a Czechoslovak publicist and editor, politician of the Czechoslovak Communist Party, an activist of women's and left-wing peace movements, and deputy of the Sněmovna lidu Federálního shromáždění ("Chamber of the People of the Federal Assembly", one of the two chambers of the Czechoslovak Federal Assembly) during the so-called Normalization period. She was the wife of the Communist politician Julius Fučík who was executed by the Nazi occupiers during the World War II.

References 

1903 births
1987 deaths
People from Benešov District
People from the Kingdom of Bohemia
Members of the Central Committee of the Communist Party of Czechoslovakia
Members of the Chamber of the People of Czechoslovakia (1971–1976)
Members of the Chamber of the People of Czechoslovakia (1976–1981)
Socialist feminists